The Kahl plant was the first nuclear power plant ever to be built in Germany.  It was located in Karlstein am Main and was an (at the time) experimental boiling water reactor.  It was built by General Electric and supplied by Siemens. At the end of 2008, the demolition works had been finished.

The station was the subject of the 1961 short documentary film, Kahl.

See also

Nuclear power in Germany

References

Former nuclear power stations in Germany
Economy of Bavaria
Buildings and structures in Aschaffenburg (district)